The 1945 United Kingdom general election was a national election held on Thursday 5 July 1945, but polling in some constituencies was delayed by some days, and the counting of votes was delayed until 26 July to provide time for overseas votes to be brought to Britain. The governing Conservative Party sought to maintain its position in Parliament but faced challenges from public opinion about the future of the United Kingdom in the post-war period. Prime Minister Winston Churchill proposed to call for a general election in Parliament, which passed with a majority vote less than two months after the conclusion of the Second World War in Europe.

The election's campaigning was focused on leadership of the country and its postwar future. Churchill sought to use his wartime popularity as part of his campaign to keep the Conservatives in power after a wartime coalition had been in place since 1940 with the other political parties, but he faced questions from public opinion surrounding the Conservatives' actions in the 1930s and his ability to handle domestic issues unrelated to warfare. Clement Attlee, leader of the Labour Party, had been Deputy Prime Minister in the wartime coalition in 1940-1945 and was seen as a more competent leader by voters, particularly those who feared a return to the levels of unemployment in the 1930s and sought a strong figurehead in British politics to lead the postwar rebuilding of the country. Opinion polls when the election was called showed strong approval ratings for Churchill, but Labour had gradually gained support for months before the war's conclusion.

The final result of the election showed Labour to have won a landslide victory, making a net gain of 239 seats, winning 47.7% of the popular vote and achieving a majority of 145 seats, thus allowing Attlee to be appointed prime minister. This election marked the first time that the Labour Party had won an outright majority in Parliament, and allowed Attlee to begin implementing the party's post-war reforms for the country. For the Conservatives, the Labour victory was a shock, as they suffered a net loss of 189 seats although they won 36.2% of the vote and had campaigned on the mistaken belief that Churchill would win as people praised his progression of the war. Of the other two major parties, the Liberal Party faced a serious blow after taking a net loss of nine seats with a vote share of 9.0%, many within urban areas and including the seat held by its leader, Archibald Sinclair. The Liberal National Party fared significantly worse, enduring a net loss of 22 seats with a vote share of 2.9%, with its leader Ernest Brown losing his seat.

The 10.7% swing from the Conservatives to an opposition party is the largest since the Acts of Union 1800; the Conservative loss of the vote exceeded that of the 1906 Liberal landslide ousting of a Conservative administration. It was also the first election since 1906 in which the Conservatives did not win the popular vote. Churchill remained actively involved in politics and returned as prime minister after leading his party into the 1951 general election. For the Liberal National Party the election was their last as a distinct party, as they merged with the Conservatives in 1947 while Ernest Brown resigned from politics in the aftermath of the election.

Dissolution of Parliament and campaign
Held less than two months following VE Day, it was the first general election since 1935, as general elections had been suspended by Parliament during the Second World War. Clement Attlee, the leader of the Labour Party, refused Winston Churchill's offer of continuing the wartime coalition until the Allied defeat of Japan. On 15 June, King George VI dissolved Parliament, which had been sitting for nearly ten years without an election.

The Labour manifesto, "Let Us Face the Future", included promises of nationalisation, economic planning, full employment, a National Health Service, and a system of social security. The manifesto proved popular with the electorate, selling a million and a half copies. The Conservative manifesto, "Mr. Churchill's Declaration to the Voters", on the other hand, included progressive ideas on key social issues but was relatively vague on the idea of postwar economic control, and the party was associated with high levels of unemployment in the 1930s. It failed to convince voters that it could effectively deal with unemployment in a postwar Britain. In May 1945, when the war in Europe ended, Churchill's approval ratings stood at 83%, but the Labour Party had held an 18% poll lead as of February 1945.

The polls for some seats were delayed until 12 July and in Nelson and Colne until 19 July because of local wakes weeks. The results were counted and declared on 26 July to allow time to transport the votes of those serving overseas. Victory over Japan Day ensued on 15 August.

Outcome
The caretaker government, led by Churchill, was heavily defeated. The Labour Party led by Attlee won a landslide victory and gained a majority of 145 seats. It was the first election in which Labour gained a majority of seats and the first in which it won a plurality of votes.

The election was a disaster for the Liberal Party, which lost all of its urban seats, and marked its transition from being a party of government to a party of the political fringe. Its leader, Archibald Sinclair, lost his rural seat of Caithness and Sutherland. That was the last general election until 2019 in which a major party leader lost their seat, but Sinclair lost only by a handful of votes in a very tight three-way contest.

The Liberal National Party fared even worse by losing two thirds of its seats and falling behind the Liberals in seat count for the first time since the parties split in 1931. It was the final election that the Liberal Nationals fought as an autonomous party, as they merged with the Conservative Party two years later although they continued to exist as a subsidiary party of the Conservatives until 1968.

Future prominent figures who entered Parliament included Harold Wilson, James Callaghan, Barbara Castle, Michael Foot and Hugh Gaitskell. Future Conservative Prime Minister Harold Macmillan lost his seat, but he returned to Parliament at a by-election later that year.

Reasons for Labour victory

Ralph Ingersoll reported in late 1940:

The historian Henry Pelling, noting that polls showed a steady Labour lead after 1942, pointed to long-term forces that caused the Labour landslide: the usual swing against the party in power, the Conservative loss of initiative, wide fears of a return to the high unemployment of the 1930s, the theme that socialist planning would be more efficient in operating the economy and the mistaken belief that Churchill would continue as prime minister regardless of the result.

Labour strengths

The greatest factor in Labour's dramatic win appeared to be its policy of social reform. In one opinion poll, 41% of respondents considered housing to be the most important issue that faced the country, 15% stated the Labour policy of full employment, 7% mentioned social security, 6% nationalisation, and just 5% international security, which was emphasised by the Conservatives.

The Beveridge Report, published in 1942, proposed the creation of a welfare state. It called for a dramatic turn in British social policy, with provision for nationalised healthcare, expansion of state-funded education, National Insurance and a new housing policy. The report was extremely popular, and copies of its findings were widely purchased, turning it into a best-seller. The Labour Party adopted the report eagerly, and the Conservatives (including Churchill, who did not regard the reforms as socialist) accepted many of the principles of the report, but claimed that they were not affordable. Labour offered a new comprehensive welfare policy, reflecting a consensus that social changes were needed. The Conservatives were not willing to make the same changes that Labour proposed and appeared out of step with public opinion.

Labour played to the concept of "winning the peace" that would follow the war. Possibly for that reason, there was especially strong support for Labour in the armed services, which feared the unemployment and homelessness to which the soldiers of the First World War had returned. It has been claimed that the left-wing bias of teachers in the armed services was a contributing factor, but that argument has generally not carried much weight, and the failure of the Conservative governments in the 1920s to deliver a "land fit for heroes" was likely more important.

Labour had also been given during the war the opportunity to display to the electorate its domestic competence in government, under men such as Attlee as Deputy Prime Minister, Herbert Morrison at the Home Office and Ernest Bevin at the Ministry of Labour. The differing wartime strategies of the two parties likewise gave Labour an advantage. Labour continued to attack prewar Conservative governments for their inactivity in tackling Hitler, reviving the economy and rearming Britain, but Churchill was less interested in furthering his party, much to the chagrin of many of its members and MPs.

Conservative weaknesses
Though voters respected and liked Churchill's wartime record, they were more distrustful of the Conservative Party's domestic and foreign policy record in the late 1930s. Churchill and the Conservatives are also generally considered to have run a poor campaign in comparison to Labour. As Churchill's personal popularity remained high, the Conservatives were confident of victory and based much of their election campaign on that, rather than proposing new programmes. However, people distinguished between Churchill and his party, a contrast that Labour repeatedly emphasised throughout the campaign. Voters also harboured doubts over Churchill's ability to lead the country on the domestic front. The writer and soldier Anthony Burgess remarked that Churchill, who then often wore a colonel's uniform, was not nearly as popular with soldiers at the front as with officers and civilians. Burgess noted that Churchill often smoked cigars in front of soldiers who had not had a decent cigarette in days.

In addition to the poor Conservative general election strategy, Churchill went so far as to accuse Attlee of seeking to behave as a dictator, despite Attlee's service as part of Churchill's war cabinet. In the most famous incident of the campaign, Churchill's first election broadcast on 4 June backfired dramatically and memorably. Denouncing his former coalition partners, he declared that Labour "would have to fall back on some form of a Gestapo" to impose socialism on Britain. Attlee responded the next night by ironically thanking the prime minister for demonstrating to the people the difference between "Churchill the great wartime leader" and "Churchill the peacetime politician" and argued the case for public control of industry.

Another blow to the Conservative campaign was the memory of the 1930s policy of appeasement, which had been conducted by Churchill's Conservative predecessors, Neville Chamberlain and Stanley Baldwin, but had been widely discredited for allowing Adolf Hitler's Germany to become too powerful. Labour had strongly advocated appeasement until 1938, but the interwar period had been dominated by Conservatives. With the exception of two brief minority Labour governments in 1924 and 1929–1931, the Conservatives had been in power for all of the interwar period. As a result, the Conservatives were generally blamed for the era's mistakes: appeasement, inflation and the unemployment of the Great Depression. Many voters felt that although the First World War had been won, the peace that followed had been lost.

Results

|}

Votes summary

Seats summary

Transfers of seats

All comparisons are with the winning party in the 1935 election; the aim is to provide a comparison with the previous general election. This list includes seats where the incumbent was standing down and therefore there was no possibility of a particular person being defeated. 
In some cases the sitting MP had changed to the gaining party. Such circumstances are marked with a *.
In other circumstances the gaining party had won a by-election in the intervening years, and then retained the seat in 1945. Such circumstances are marked with a †.

Opinion polls

Polls showed a lead for Labour since 1943, except for one poll in June 1945 when both Labour and the Conservatives tied on 45%.

See also
 List of MPs elected in the 1945 United Kingdom general election
 1945 United Kingdom general election in Northern Ireland
 1945 Prime Minister's Resignation Honours
 Attlee ministry

References

Sources

 
 
 
 
 McCallum, R. B. and Alison Readman. The British General Election of 1945 (Nuffield Studies) (1964)

Further reading

 
 
  Historiography
 
 
 
 
 
  The standard scholarly study

External links

 Catalogue of general election ephemera held at LSE Archives
 
 http://www.election.demon.co.uk/geresults.html

Manifestos
 Mr. Churchill's Declaration of Policy to the Electors , 1945 Conservative Party manifesto
 Let Us Face the Future, 1945 Labour Party manifesto
 20 Point Manifesto of the Liberal Party , 1945 Liberal Party manifesto

 
1945
General election
July 1945 events in the United Kingdom
Electoral history of Winston Churchill
Clement Attlee